A list of notable photographers from Poland:

Mariusz Adamski
Mirosław Araszewski
Leon Barszczewski
Andrzej Baturo
Zdzisław Beksiński
Joshua Budziszewski Benor
Paweł Bielec
Wilhelm Brasse
Sylwester Braun
Zbigniew Brym
Jan Bułhak
Michał Cała
Erazm Ciołek
Jacenty Dędek
Zbigniew Dłubak
Maksymilian Fajans
Janusz Gajos
Jadwiga Golcz
Edward Hartwig
Mariusz Hermanowicz
Ryszard Horowitz
Zuzanna Janin
Mieczysław Karłowicz
Bogdan Konopka
Ewa Kuryluk
Eugeniusz Lokajski
Andrzej Majewski
Michal Martychowiec
Maciej Michalski
Justyna Mielnikiewicz (born 1973)
Rafał Milach
Chris Niedenthal
Szymon Niemiec
Kazimierz Nowak
Krzysztof Olszewski
Stanisław Julian Ostroróg, ps Walery father
Stanisław Julian Ignacy Ostroróg, ps Walery son 
Andrzej Pawłowski
Jarosław Pijarowski
Joanna Piotrowska
Wojciech Plewiński
Robert Pranagal
Włodzimierz Puchalski
Henryk Ross
Eva Rubinstein
Wilhelm Russ
Walery Rzewuski
Jeanloup Sieff
David Seymour
Tomasz Sobecki
Rosław Szaybo
Stefan Themerson
Jerzy Tomaszewski
Jacek Tylicki
Piotr Uklański
Stanisław Ignacy Witkiewicz
Casimir Zagourski
Joanna Zastróżna
Artur Żmijewski (filmmaker)

References

 
Photographers
Polish